Niki Terpstra (born 18 May 1984) is a Dutch former racing cyclist, who rode professionally between 2003 and 2022 for six different teams. He is the brother of fellow racing cyclist Mike Terpstra. He is the third Dutch cyclist to have won both of the cobbled Monument spring classics, Paris–Roubaix and the Tour of Flanders, after Jan Raas and Hennie Kuiper.

Career

Early life and career

Niki Terpstra was born on 18 May 1984 in Beverwijk in the Netherlands.

He was part of the silver medal-winning team in the team pursuit in the 2005 UCI Track Cycling World Championships, together with Levi Heimans, Jens Mouris and Peter Schep. With a 4th place in the Three Days of De Panne followed by a 14th place at the 2008 Tour of Flanders, young Terpstra showed signs of considerable talent.

Between 2007 and 2010, Terpstra rode for the German . In 2009 Terpstra won the 3rd stage in the Critérium du Dauphiné Libéré, gaining the yellow leader jersey at the same time, keeping it for a day.

Quick-Step (2011–2018)

2011–2014

In 2011, Terpstra joined the Belgian UCI World Tour  team.

In 2012, Terpstra took a prestigious victory at the Dwars door Vlaanderen, winning in solo fashion after being on the attack all day. He dropped Wallays on the Paterberg and finished the race with an advantage of 47 seconds over Frenchman Sylvain Chavanel.

In 2014 he won his first short stage race with the victory in the Tour of Qatar. Terpstra continued his good form in the classics, placing fifth in Omloop Het Nieuwsblad, winning the Dwars door Vlaanderen for the second time in his career, and placing sixth in the Tour of Flanders. On 13 April 2014 he won the Paris–Roubaix race in solo fashion, after attacking from the leading group of 11 riders with  remaining.

2015
In 2015, Terpstra defended his Tour of Qatar title, holding the race lead after winning the individual time trial on Stage 3. At Omloop Het Nieuwsblad, Terpstra made the decisive breakaway of four riders with teammates Tom Boonen and Stijn Vandenbergh, along with Ian Stannard. After Stannard closed down a Boonen attack in the closing stages Terpstra tried to counterattack, but Vandenbergh closed the gap, allowing Stannard to attack with only Terpstra able to follow. Stannard went on to beat Terpstra in the sprint finish. In March Terpstra had some success, first by getting the second position in the Ronde van Zeeland Seaports. He then got on the second step of the podium of a very windy Gent–Wevelgem, as he won the two-man sprint for second position after Luca Paolini had crossed the line solo. In his next race, the Tour of Flanders, he broke away from the peloton with Alexander Kristoff  from the finish but could not beat Kristoff in the final sprint, completing the race in second place. In June, he won the Dutch National Road Race Championships in a bunch sprint, surprising the pure sprinters.

2016
In 2016, Terpstra won the Eneco Tour after a dramatic rain-swept final stage that saw former race leader Rohan Dennis crash out. The stage featured cobbles and bergs used in the Classics first saw Dennis lose time, and then drop out completely due to his injuries. Terpstra, who started the final stage in fifth place overall, formed part of a front group of three riders and finished second behind stage winner Edvald Boasson Hagen.

2018

In 2018, Terpstra won E3 Harelbeke, soloing to the line after initially attacking on the Taaienberg with teammate Yves Lampaert with more than  remaining. Terpstra finished 20 seconds clear of an elite group, led home by his team-mate Philippe Gilbert, and he became the first Dutchman to win E3 Harelbeke since Steven de Jongh in 2003.
Terpstra won the Tour of Flanders with a late solo attack. After following an attack by Vincenzo Nibali over the Kruisberg climb, Terpstra dropped the Italian soon after, then caught and quickly dispatched a trio of riders from an earlier breakaway on the final climb of the Oude Kwaremont. Terpstra remained clear over the remaining , finishing 12 seconds ahead of 's Mads Pedersen from the earlier breakaway, and by teammate and defending race-winner Gilbert who led the bunch home in third. It was his second 'Monument' victory and he became the first Dutch rider since Adri van der Poel in 1986 to win the Tour of Flanders. The following week, Terpstra claimed third place at Paris–Roubaix, leading home a group 57 seconds behind winner Peter Sagan and Silvan Dillier.

Direct Énergie (2019–2022)
In 2019, Terpstra joined French team .

On 16 June 2020, Terpstra was involved in a crash in the Netherlands. While motor-pacing, he was forced to avoid hitting a pack of geese at high speed, hitting a rock and falling to the ground. He was initially ruled out of racing for three months, but returned to racing at August's Tour de Wallonie.

In September 2022 Terpstra announced his retirement from professional road racing.

Personal life
In 2021, Terpstra launched his own casual clothing line, Speed On Wheels, together with Futurum.

Major results

Track

2004
 1st  Scratch, National Championships
2005
 National Championships
1st  Scratch
1st  Points race
 2nd  Team pursuit, UCI World Championships
2006
 National Championships
1st  Individual pursuit
1st  Madison (with Wim Stroetinga)
2007
 National Championships
1st  Scratch
1st  Madison (with Wim Stroetinga)
2011
 2nd  Madison, National Championships (with Yoeri Havik)
2013
 1st Six Days of Rotterdam (with Iljo Keisse)
2014
 1st Six Days of Rotterdam (with Iljo Keisse)
 1st Six Days of Amsterdam (with Yoeri Havik)
2015
 1st Six Days of Rotterdam (with Iljo Keisse)
2016
 3rd Six Days of Rotterdam (with Yoeri Havik)
2019
 1st Six Days of Rotterdam (with Thomas Boudat)
2022
 2nd Six Days of Rotterdam (with Yoeri Havik)

Road
Source:

2004
 1st GP Wielerrevue
 1st Stage 2 Ronde van Midden-Brabant
2005
 1st Omloop der Kempen
2006
 1st Overall OZ Wielerweekend
1st Points classification
1st Stage 2 (ITT)
 1st Ronde van Midden-Nederland
 1st Stage 4 Tour of Belgium
 1st Stage 6 Tour de Normandie
 2nd Ronde van Overijssel
 3rd Time trial, National Under-23 Championships
 3rd Colliers Classic
2007
 1st  Mountains classification, Deutschland Tour
 3rd Hel van het Mergelland
2008
 3rd Overall Bayern Rundfahrt
 4th Overall Three Days of De Panne
 5th Dutch Food Valley Classic
  Combativity award Stage 13 Tour de France
2009
 1st Ridderronde Maastricht
 1st Stage 3 Critérium du Dauphiné Libéré
 2nd Overall Ster Elektrotoer
1st Prologue
 9th Omloop Het Nieuwsblad
2010
 National Championships
1st  Road race
5th Time trial
 1st Sparkassen Giro Bochum
 3rd Dwars door Vlaanderen
 6th Overall Tour of Oman
2011
 2nd Overall Ster ZLM Toer
 6th Overall Tour of Belgium
 6th Omloop Het Nieuwsblad
 10th Overall Tour of Beijing
  Combativity award Stage 15 Tour de France
2012
 1st  Team time trial, UCI World Championships
 National Championships
1st  Road race
3rd Time trial
 1st Dwars door Vlaanderen
 1st Amstel Curaçao Race
 3rd Overall Eneco Tour
 3rd Paris–Tours
 5th Overall Three Days of De Panne
 5th Paris–Roubaix
 6th Tour of Flanders
2013
 1st  Team time trial, UCI World Championships
 1st Stage 1 (TTT) Tirreno–Adriatico
 National Championships
2nd Time trial
5th Road race
 3rd Overall Driedaagse van West-Vlaanderen
 3rd Overall Three Days of De Panne
 3rd Paris–Roubaix
 6th Grand Prix Cycliste de Québec
 9th Overall Tour of Belgium
 10th Paris–Tours
2014
 1st  Overall Tour of Qatar
1st Stage 1
 1st Paris–Roubaix
 1st Dwars door Vlaanderen
 1st Amstel Curaçao Race
 2nd Road race, National Championships
 2nd E3 Harelbeke
 3rd  Team time trial, UCI World Championships
 4th Overall Three Days of De Panne
 5th Omloop Het Nieuwsblad
 6th Tour of Flanders
 9th Overall Tour of Belgium
2015
 1st  Road race, National Championships
 1st  Overall Tour of Qatar
1st Stage 3 (ITT)
 1st  Overall Tour de Wallonie
1st Stage 1
 2nd  Team time trial, UCI World Championships
 2nd Tour of Flanders
 2nd Omloop Het Nieuwsblad
 2nd Ronde van Zeeland Seaports
 2nd Gent–Wevelgem
 8th Road race, European Games
2016
 UCI World Championships
1st  Team time trial
9th Road race
 1st  Overall Eneco Tour
 1st Le Samyn
 1st Dwars door het Hageland
 10th Overall Tour of Belgium
 10th Tour of Flanders
2017
 3rd Tour of Flanders
 3rd Paris–Tours
 4th Gent–Wevelgem
2018
 1st  Team time trial, UCI World Championships
 1st Tour of Flanders
 1st E3 Harelbeke
 1st Le Samyn
 1st Stage 1 (TTT) Adriatica Ionica Race
 2nd Time trial, National Championships
 2nd Paris–Tours
 3rd Paris–Roubaix
 9th Overall BinckBank Tour
 9th Dwars door Vlaanderen
2019
 2nd Dwars door het Hageland
 2nd Paris–Tours
 3rd Overall Tour Poitou-Charentes en Nouvelle-Aquitaine
 3rd Kuurne–Brussels–Kuurne
 3rd Le Samyn
 3rd Circuit de Wallonie
 4th Duo Normand (with Anthony Turgis)
 5th Time trial, National Championships
 7th Antwerp Port Epic
 10th Chrono des Nations
 10th Tour de Vendée

Grand Tour general classification results timeline

Monuments results timeline

Major championship results timeline

See also
 List of Dutch Olympic cyclists

References

External links

 
 
 
 
 
 
 

1984 births
Living people
Dutch male cyclists
Dutch track cyclists
Sportspeople from Beverwijk
Cyclists at the 2008 Summer Olympics
Cyclists at the 2012 Summer Olympics
Olympic cyclists of the Netherlands
UCI Road World Champions (elite men)
UCI Road World Championships cyclists for the Netherlands
European Games competitors for the Netherlands
Cyclists at the 2015 European Games
Cyclists from North Holland
20th-century Dutch people
21st-century Dutch people